Wigtownshire was a constituency represented in the Parliament of Scotland until 1707.

Shire commissioners
 1621: Robert Maclellan
 1628–33, 1643, 1644, 1645–47: Sir Patrick Agnew, 1st Baronet
 1644, 1648–49, 1665 convention, 1667 convention, 1669–72: Sir Andrew Agnew, 2nd Baronet of Lochnaw
 1661–63: Uchtred McDowall of Freuch 
 1661–63: Richard Murray of Broughton 
 1665 convention, 1681–82: Sir David Dunbar of Baldoune 
 1667 convention, 1669–72: William Maxwell of Monreith
 1672–74, 1678 convention, 1681–82: Sir James Dalrymple, 1st Baronet
 1678 convention: Sir Godfrey Macculloch, 2nd Baronet
 1685, 1689 convention, 1689–1702: Sir Andrew Agnew, 3rd Baronet (died 1702)
 1685: William Steuart of Castlestuart 
 1689 (convention), 1689–1700: William McDowell of Garthland (died c.1700) 
 1700–02, 1702–07: William Steuart the elder of Castlesteuart 
 1702, 1702–07: John Stewart of Sorbie

References

History of Galloway
Politics of Dumfries and Galloway
Constituencies of the Parliament of Scotland (to 1707)
Constituencies disestablished in 1707
1707 disestablishments in Scotland